Colonel The Honourable Heneage Legge (3 July 1845 – 1 November 1911)
was a British soldier and Conservative politician.

Legge was the fifth son of William Legge, 4th Earl of Dartmouth, by his second wife the Honourable Frances, daughter of George Barrington, 5th Viscount Barrington. William Legge, 5th Earl of Dartmouth was his half-brother and the Right Reverend Augustus Legge his full brother.

Legge was a Captain in the Coldstream Guards and a Colonel in the 9th Lancers. At the 1900 general election he was returned to parliament for St George's Hanover Square.
He was re-elected in January 1906, but resigned from the Commons on 11 June 1906 by accepting the post of Steward of the Chiltern Hundreds.

Legge died unmarried in November 1911, aged 66.

References

External links
 

1845 births
1911 deaths
9th Queen's Royal Lancers officers
Coldstream Guards officers
Conservative Party (UK) MPs for English constituencies
Heneage
UK MPs 1900–1906
UK MPs 1906–1910
Younger sons of earls